Yonas was a nineteenth-century Ethiopian emperor. Other notable people with the name include:

 Yonas (rapper), American hip hop artist 
 Yonas Beyene, Ethiopian archaeologist
 Yonas Fissahaye (born 1991), Eritrean racing cyclist
 Yonas Kifle (born 1977), Eritrean runner
 Yonas Kinde (born 1980), Ethiopian track and field athlete
 Yonas Malede (born 1999),  Israeli footballer
 Yonas Mekuria, first officer of hijacked Ethiopian Airlines Flight 961
 Yonas Monteyunas (born 1940), Soviet rower
 Johnny Ramensky (born Yonas Ramanauckas, 1905–1972), British criminal

See also 
 Jonas (disambiguation)
 Yona (disambiguation)
 Yunus (given name), includes other spellings